The Horlick Mountains are a mountain range in the Transantarctic Mountains of Antarctica.  Some sources indicate that the designation includes the Ohio Range, the Long Hills, and all of the Wisconsin Range, while others suggest that it includes only the eastern portion of the Queen Maud Mountains and the main body of the Wisconsin Range.  At one point the designation also included the Thiel Mountains.

Portions of the Wisconsin Range are recorded in aerial photography obtained by USN Operation Highjump, 1946–47. The entire mountain group was surveyed by USARP parties and was mapped from U.S. Navy aerial photographs, 1959–64. Named by Admiral Richard E. Byrd for William Horlick, of the Horlick's Malted Milk Corp., a supporter of the Byrd expedition of 1933–35.

Further reading 
 Gunter Faure, Teresa M. Mensing, The Transantarctic Mountains: Rocks, Ice, Meteorites and Water, P 201
 Edmund Stump, The Ross Orogen of the Transantarctic  Mountains, P 166
 R. L. Oliver, P. R. James, J. B. Jago, Antarctic Earth Science, P 94

See also 
Hercules Dome
Higgins Canyon

References

External links 
 Horlick Mountains on USGS website
 Horlick Mountains on SCAR website
 Horlick Mountains on peakbagger website
 Horlick Mountains image
 Long term weather forecast for Horlick Mountains
 current weather at Horlick Mountains

Transantarctic Mountains
Mountain ranges of Marie Byrd Land
Wilkes Land